Davis Schneiderman (born 1974) is an American writer, academic, and higher-education administrator. He is a professor of English and Krebs Provost and Dean of the Faculty at Lake Forest College in Illinois. Prior to that appointment, he served as Associate Dean of the Faculty for Strategy and Innovation.

Biography
Schneiderman earned a B.A. from the Pennsylvania State University (1996), an M.A. (1998) and Ph.D. (2001) from Binghamton University. In 2001 he became a professor of English at Lake Forest College, and was Associate Dean of the Faculty from 2013 to 2018. He formerly served as Director of the Center for Chicago Programs, Lake Forest College In The Loop (a residential program in Chicago) and Forest College Press / &NOW Books. He currently serves as a national board member of the &NOW organization that has partnered with the University of Paris, UCSD, the University of Colorado at Boulder, and CalArts, among others. Schneiderman as edited the anthology, The &NOW AWARDS: The Best Innovative Writing.

Schneiderman is former chair of English Department, American Studies Program, and is currently Director of Digital Chicago, a four-year grant funded by the Andrew W. Mellon Foundation. Schneiderman also directed an early digital humanities project, the NEH-funded Virtual Burnham Initiative, a project to create 3-D models of the 1909 Plan of Chicago.

A popular community lecturer, Schneiderman live interviews the authors of the Lake Forest Reads: Ragdale one-book program in Lake Forest, IL; including Lauren Groff in 2016. The Highland Park Public Library in Highland Park, IL, has recently named the Schneiderman-led discussion series "Discussions with Davis."

He lives in Highland Park, IL with the actor Kelly Haramis, and their two daughters.

Works
Schneiderman is the author or editor of 10 books. As a creative writer, his recent novels include the DEAD/BOOKS trilogy, including the blank novel BLANK, the plagiarized novel [SIC](a collaboration with Andi Olsen, with an introduction by Oulipo member Daniel Levin-Becker) and the ink-smeared novel INK. (collaboration with Tim Guthrie); as well as the sci-fi dystopia novel Drain (Northwestern). Schneiderman edited wrote the introduction for the last novel from WWII survivor Raymond Federman. Schneiderman's work has appeared in numerous publications including Fiction International, Harpers.org, The Chicago Tribune, The Iowa Review, TriQuarterly, and Exquisite Corpse; he is a long-time contributor for The Huffington Post.

Writing about his novel Drain, reviewer Renée E. D'Aoust praised the way Schneiderman "conjures images within images" and called the book "creepy and bloody effective". Writing about Schneiderman's work, critic Edward S. Robinson notes that Schneiderman's "novels are imbued with theoretical complexity and a keen self-awareness, but without being smugly in your face with self-reflexivity....[and] his writing indisputably engages with contemporary discourse and is designed to provoke thought and debate."

Schneiderman's work has garnered notice for its unusual packaging, as well as for its writing. He bound his first book Multifesto in sandpaper to purposely damage the books next to it. Another of his books was encased in plaster. BLANK had collage musical tracks provided by Paul Miller, aka dj spooky. The remix edition of his debut novel Multifesto, originally 20086 and republished in 2013, contained remixes from the author Roxane Gay, Matt Bell, and Kathleen Rooney, among others.

As a scholar, Schneiderman is a recognized expert on the work of William S. Burroughs, and his co-edited collection Retaking the Universe: William S. Burroughs in the Age of Globalization was republished on its tenth anniversary at Realitystudio.com, the leading Burroughs website. Schneiderman has also written extensively about innovative literature, the Surrealist Exquisite Corpse, and copyright and collage and remix culture.

As a journalist and essayist, Schneiderman has interviewed John Waters, Temple Grandin, Edward Snowden's ACLU lawyer Ben Wizner, Sherry Turkle, David Shields, Ruth Ozeki, Jean Kwok, and Aleksandar Hemon, about his work as a writer for the Netflix series Sense8, among others.

As Director of Lake Forest College Press, Schneiderman has published books on transportation and architectural issues including Beyond Burnham: An Illustrated History of Planning for the Chicago Region and Terminal Town: An Illustrated Guide to Chicago's Airports, Bus Depots, Train Stations, and Steamship Landings, 1939 - Present.  Schneiderman and the author of these works, Joseph P. Schwieterman of DePaul University's Chaddick Institute for Metropolitan Development, collaborated through the Digital Chicago grant on Windy City in Motion, an exhibit at Chicago's Union Station.

Digital humanities and non-paper works 
Schneiderman has directed several digital humanities projects. These include the six-campus Exquisite Corpse project (2002-2005), funded by the Midwest Instructional Technology Center among Lake Forest College, Kenyon College, DePauw University, Monmouth College, Oberlin College, and Colorado College; the Virtual Burnham Initiative (2007-2010) funded by the National Endowment for the Humanities Office of Digital Humanities. His Virtual Burnham Initiative, and the work is now part of the Chicago History Museum digital collection, as part of the Digital Chicago website.

In addition, Schneiderman has served as PI for three grants from funded by The Andrew W. Mellon Foundation. This first was a planning grant among Lake Forest College, Knox College, and Beloit College for a collaboration among English Departments, and the four-year $800,000 Digital Chicago: Unearthing History and Culture project. Digital Chicago involves "students and faculty in exploring specific at-risk or forgotten sites in Chicago's history, through urban archeological digs, innovative digital humanities projects, and complementary coursework in a wide array of disciplines, including English, History, Art, Music, and others." The works from Digital Chicago are now housed at the Chicago History Museum digital collection, and include Schneiderman's Virtual Burnham project, which "transforms a selection of flat images from the 1909 Plan of Chicago—by Daniel H. Burnham and Edward H. Bennett into 3-D models." The third grant is the $1.1 million Humanities 2020 initiative, a partnership between Lake Forest College and the Chicago History Museum, the Chicago Humanities Festival, and other Chicago cultural and humanitarian organizations.

As a multimedia artist, Schneiderman creates audio, video and performance works as part of The Muttering Sickness collective, and recent works include "Modern Business Machines" a collaboration with actor and director Regina Taylor and Chicago's Goodman Theater; performances as the 2014 and 2016 Chicago Humanities Festival; the former in performance with Jon Langford (of The Mekons) and Anne Waldman and others; the latter debuting a drone video connected to the Art Institute of Chicago's exhibit on Hungarian artist Lazlo Moholy-Nagy, published at Big Other; and an album, The Last Days of Radio, released on poet Ann Waldman's record label.

Schneiderman is also the lead writer for Tim Guthrie's award-winning exhibit The Museum of Alternative History, with the Omaha Reader noting that the show "is conceived of and executed masterfully. It taps into the current zeitgeist, which supports the twisting of fact, skewing of science, and values opinion and belief over data and truth." The show won the Omaha Arts and Entertainment Awards and Best Group Show in the group's 8th- and 13th-annual awards. The Museum's most-recent award-winning run, from June 1 – September 26, 2018 at Omaha's KANEKO gallery, and was followed by a "pop-up" exhibit at the 2019 &NOW Festival at the University of Washington, Bothell.

Media appearances
Schneiderman is featured prominently in the 2019 documentary film The World According to Radiohead, from ARTE TV, where he discusses Radiohead's connection to Noam Chomsky and Naomi Klein. He has appeared on Chicago area and national media, including Chicago Tonight where he offered counter-intuitive college success tips, the Collegiate Empowerment podcast, among others.

Bibliography

Novels
INK.: a novel. (Jaded Ibis, 2016).
SIC: a novel. (Jaded Ibis, 2013).
Blank: a novel. (Jaded Ibis, 2011).
Drain. (TriQuarterly/Northwestern, 2010).
DIS, Or, in the Shadow of the Dome of Pleasure. (Buffalo, NY: BlazeVOX Books, 2008).
Abecedarium. [w/ Carlos Hernandez] (Portland, OR: Chiasmus Press, 2007).
Multifesto: A Henri d’Mescan Reader. (New York: Spuyten Duyvil Press. Limited-edition art book, 2006; remix edition 2013).

Edited collections
The Exquisite Corpse: Chance and Collaboration in Surrealism's Parlor Game. Eds. Kanta Kochhar-Lindgren, Davis Schneiderman, and Tom Denlinger. (Lincoln, NE: University of Nebraska Press, 2009).
Retaking the Universe: William S. Burroughs in the Age of Globalization. Eds. Davis Schneiderman and Philip Walsh. (London: Pluto Press, 2004; Reality Studio, 2014).

Audiocollage albums
The Last Days of Radio. (Fast-Speaking Music, 2015).
Memorials to Future Catastrophes (with Don Meyer and Tom Denlinger). (Kansas City, MO: Jaded Ibis Productions, 2008).

References

External links
 

21st-century American novelists
American male novelists
Postmodernists
Writers from Chicago
1974 births
Living people
Pennsylvania State University alumni
Binghamton University alumni
Lake Forest College faculty
21st-century American male writers
Novelists from Illinois